Acalolepta bisericans is a species of beetle in the family Cerambycidae. It was described by Kriesche in 1936. It is known from the Solomon Islands.

References

Acalolepta
Beetles described in 1936